Lungachi is the name of several rural localities in Volkhovsky District of Leningrad Oblast, Russia:
Lungachi (settlement), a settlement at the railway station in Selivanovskoye Settlement Municipal Formation of Volkhovsky District in Leningrad Oblast; 
Lungachi (village), a village in Selivanovskoye Settlement Municipal Formation of Volkhovsky District in Leningrad Oblast;